Kushe Aunsi (Gokarna Aunsi or Buwa ko Mukh Herne Din) is a Nepalese Hindu lunar festival of celebrating fatherhood and paternal bonds, equivalent to the Father's Day celebration. The festival falls on the new moon day of the Hindu month of Bhadra (late August or early September). The cow-eared incarnation of lord Shiva— Gokarneswor Mahadev is also worshipped on this day. 

Many people go to pilgrimage to Gokarneswor Mahadev temple, located northeastern part of Kathmandu, and they bathe and make offerings. People whose father has died also perform Shraddha (yearly death rituals).

Etymology 

The festival falls on the day of new moon day known as Aunsi in Nepali. The word Kushe is derived from the word Kush, a holy plant in Hinduism. On this day, people bring new Kush plant into their home. The plant is worshipped as a symbol of Lord Bishnu. 

The festival is also commonly known as Buwa ko Mukh Herne Din, literally translated as 'day to see one's father's face' in Nepali language. The children worship their father, feed him sweets and delicacies, and give him a gift as a part of the celebration. 

The festival is also known as Gokarna Aunsi, literally translated as cow-eared (Gokarna) and new moon night (Aunsi). 

Pitri Aunsi is another name of the festival. Pitri means spirits of the departed ancestors in Hindu culture. On this day, the spirits of the departed ancestors are also worshipped.

Moti Jayanti 
The birth anniversary of the prominent Nepalese poet Motiram Bhatta is celebrated on this day every year. Bhatta was born on the day of Kushe Aunsi in 1866. He also died on the same day in 1996 at the age of 30.

See also 

 Matatirtha Aunsi, Nepalese Mother's Day.

References

Festivals in Nepal
August observances
September observances

Hindu festivals in Nepal